Lake Creek is a  tributary of Catskill Creek in Albany and Schoharie counties, New York, in the United States.  Via Catskill Creek, it is part of the Hudson River watershed.  Lake Creek runs from the Rensselaerville State Forest in the town of Rensselaerville to Catskill Creek at Livingstonville in the town of Broome.

See also
List of rivers of New York

References

Rivers of New York (state)
Rivers of Albany County, New York
Rivers of Schoharie County, New York
Tributaries of the Hudson River